Joshua Phillip Marquet (born 3 December 1969) is an Australian former cricketer, who played for Tasmania.

Marquet was a sharpish fast bowler, debuting in the 1994–95 season, who opened the Tasmanian bowling attack in the late 1990s, but often proved expensive, and as a result, failed to hold down a regular berth in the side. He bowled well with the breeze from the Derwent River at his back, but was often inconsistent. He fared slightly better in domestic one-day cricket, but retired in 2004.

External links

1969 births
Living people
Tasmania cricketers
Norfolk cricketers
Australian cricketers
Cricketers from Melbourne